Tejon may refer to:

 Tejon, California
 Fort Tejon, California
 Tejon Pass
 Tejón, a Mexican name for Coati, an animal in the raccoon family
 Tejon Indian Tribe of California